Denise Betsema (born 23 January 1993) is a Dutch cyclo-cross cyclist, who currently rides for UCI Cyclo-cross team .

Career
In October 2018 Betsema joined the professional cyclo-cross team . In the season 2018–2019 she won the crosses at Poprad, Neerpelt, Aigle, Hittnau, Lutterbach, Wachtebeke, Koksijde, Eschenbach, Antwerpen, Otegem, Maldegem, Middelkerke, Hulst, Leuven and Oostmalle. She also won the bronze medal at the European championships.

Positive drug test
On 5 April 2019, it was announced that she had tested positive for the use of steroids in a drug test on 27 January 2019 during the World Cup in Hoogerheide. Betsema denies the facts but she was temporarily suspended by her team awaiting the outcome of the counter-expertise. On 16 May, it was announced her B sample was also positive for steroids. 

On 20 January 2020, the UCI announced that besides in Hoogerheide, she had also failed a doping test in Middelkerke. The UCI proposed the rider a retroactive sanction of six months suspension, starting from 5 April 2019, which was the day her team voluntary put her on non-active status. Betsema also forfeits all results from Hoogerheide on, which meant the loss of her 2019 victories in Maldegem, Middelkerke, Hulst, Leuven, and Oostmalle. Betsema accepted the sanction proposed by the UCI but she and her legal counsels are still of the opinion she was the victim of a tainted food supplement.

Personal life
Betsema has two children and lives in Texel.

Major results

Cyclo-cross

2018–2019
 UCI World Cup
1st Koksijde
2nd Pont-Château
 DVV Trophy
1st Antwerpen
3rd Loenhout
 1st Overall EKZ CrossTour
1st Aigle
1st Hittnau
1st Eschenbach
3rd Baden
3rd Meilen
 1st Otegem
 1st Neerpelt
 1st Wachtebeke
 1st Solidarite
 1st Poprad
 2nd Hasselt
 3rd Overall Superprestige
2nd Zonhoven
3rd Diegem
 3rd  UEC European Championships
 Toi Toi Cup
3rd Unicov
2019–2020
 Rectavit Series
1st Leuven
1st Waregem
 Superprestige
2nd Middelkerke
 2nd Zonnebeke
 2nd Oostmalle
 Ethias Cross
3rd Maldegem
3rd Hulst
2020–2021
 1st Oostmalle
 1st Sint-Niklaas
 2nd Overall X²O Badkamers Trophy
1st Antwerpen
2nd Kortrijk
2nd Hamme
2nd Brussels
3rd Herentals
3rd Baal
3rd Lille
 3rd Overall UCI World Cup
1st Hulst
3rd Tábor
3rd Namur
 3rd Overall Superprestige
1st Middelkerke
2nd Gavere
2nd Merksplas
3rd Boom
3rd Niel
 Ethias Cross
1st Beringen
1st Eeklo
1st Sint-Niklaas
2nd Leuven
3rd Kruibeke
 EKZ CrossTour
1st Bern
 3rd  UCI World Championships
2021–2022
 2nd Overall UCI World Cup
1st Zonhoven
2nd Fayetteville
2nd Iowa City
2nd Koksijde
2nd Namur
3rd Waterloo
3rd Besançon
3rd Rucphen
3rd Dendermonde
 2nd Overall Superprestige
1st Ruddervoorde
2nd Gieten
3rd Niel
3rd Merksplas
3rd Boom
3rd Gavere
 2nd Overall X²O Badkamers Trophy
1st Brussels
2nd Koppenberg
2nd Loenhout
2nd Herentals
3rd Kortrijk
3rd Baal
3rd Hamme
 2nd Oostmalle
 Ethias Cross
3rd Beringen
2022–2023
 3rd Overall Superprestige
1st Ruddervoorde
2nd Niel
2nd Merksplas
2nd Boom
3rd Gullegem
 Exact Cross
1st Zonnebeke
3rd Kruibeke
3rd Beringen
3rd Meulebeke
 X²O Badkamers Trophy
2nd Koppenberg
3rd Kortrijk
 UCI World Cup
3rd Dublin
 3rd Maldegem
 3rd Oostmalle
 3rd Otegem

References

External link
  
 
 

1993 births
Living people
Dutch female cyclists
Cyclo-cross cyclists
People from Texel
Cyclists from North Holland
21st-century Dutch women